Q'umir Qucha (Quechua q'umir green, qucha lake, "green lake", other spellings Comer Cocha, Khomer Khocha) is a mountain in the Bolivian Andes, about 5,020 m (16,470 ft) high. It is located in the Anta Q'awa mountain range, the southern part of the Potosí mountain range. Q'umir Qucha is situated south-east of Potosí in the Potosí Department, in the north of the José María Linares Province. Q'umir Qucha lies north-west of the mountain Khunurana and the Yana Urqu group and south-west of the mountain Anta Q'awa. The small lake Q'umir Qucha lies at its feet, east of it. The larger lake south of Q'umir Qucha is Santa Catalina.

References 

Mountains of Potosí Department